This article lists all power stations in Benin.

Hydroelectric

Thermal

Solar

See also 
 List of power stations in Africa
 List of largest power stations in the world
 Energy in Benin

References

External links

Benin
Power stations